NGC 7004 is a spiral galaxy around 330 million light-years away from Earth in the constellation Indus. NGC 7004 has an estimated diameter of 166,980 light-years. NGC 7004 was discovered by astronomer John Herschel on October 2, 1834. NGC 7004 is also part of a group of galaxies that contains the nearby galaxy NGC 7002.

See also
 NGC 6861
 NGC 2787
 List of NGC objects (7001–7840)

References

External links

Astronomical objects discovered in 1834
Indus (constellation)
7004
Spiral galaxies
66019